Vandenboschia is a fern genus in the family Hymenophyllaceae. The genus is accepted in the Pteridophyte Phylogeny Group classification of 2016 (PPG I) but not by some other sources.

Taxonomy
The genus Vandenboschia was erected by Edwin Copeland in 1938. Its status, like other genera in the family Hymenophyllaceae, remains disputed. The Pteridophyte Phylogeny Group classification of 2016 (PPG I) accepts the genus, saying that there are about 15 species. , the Checklist of Ferns and Lycophytes of the World listed 25 species and one hybrid, whereas Plants of the World Online subsumed the genus into Trichomanes.

Species 
, the Checklist of Ferns and Lycophytes of the World accepted the following species and hybrids:

Vandenboschia amabilis (Nakai) K.Iwats.
Vandenboschia auriculata (Blume) Copel.
Vandenboschia birmanica (Bedd.) Ching
Vandenboschia boschiana (J.W.Sturm ex Bosch) Ebihara & K.Iwats.
Vandenboschia collariata (Bosch) Ebihara & K.Iwats.
Vandenboschia cyrtotheca (Hillebr.) Copel.
Vandenboschia cystoseiroides (Christ ex Tardieu & C.Chr.) Ching
Vandenboschia davallioides (Gaudich.) Copel.
Vandenboschia fargesii (Christ) Ching
Vandenboschia gigantea (Bory ex Willd.) Pic. Serm.
Vandenboschia hokurikuensis Ebihara
Vandenboschia johnstonensis (Bailey) Copel.
Vandenboschia kalamocarpa (Hayata) Ebihara
Vandenboschia lofoushanensis Ching
Vandenboschia maxima (Blume) Copel.
Vandenboschia miuraensis Ebihara
Vandenboschia nipponica (Nakai) Ebihara
Vandenboschia obtusa (Copel.) comb. ined.
Vandenboschia oshimensis (Christ) Ebihara
Vandenboschia × quelpaertensis (Nakai) Ebihara
Vandenboschia radicans (Sw.) Copel.
Vandenboschia rupestris (Raddi) Ebihara & K.Iwats.
Vandenboschia speciosa (Willd.) G.Kunkel
Vandenboschia striata (D.Don) Ebihara
Vandenboschia subclathrata K.Iwats.
Vandenboschia tubiflora F.S.Wagner

Phylogeny
Phylogeny by Fern Tree of Life.

References 

Hymenophyllales
Fern genera